Baculina is an extinct   ammonoid cephalopod genus belonging to the ancylocerid family Bochianitidae. Baculina is known from the Valanginian of the Lower Cretaceous.

References
Arkell et al., 1957, Mesozoic Ammonoidea; Treatise on Invertebrate Paleontology,  Part L, Ammonoidea. Geological Society of America & University of Kansas Press; R. C. Moore (ed) 
 Classification of J. Klein et al. 2007
J. Klein, et al. . 2007. Lower Cretaceous Ammonites III. Bochianitoidea, Protancyloceratoidea, Ancyloceratoidea, Ptychoceratoidea. Fossilium Catalogus I: Animalia 144:

Cretaceous ammonites
Ammonitida
Valanginian life